Korean schools in Japan or Zainichi Korean schools may refer to:
 Chōsen gakkō - North Korean schools in Japan
 South Korean schools operated by the Mindan